John D. Milliman (born 5 May 1938) is a retired American Emeritus Professor of marine geology. He is a professor emeritus in the department of physical sciences and in the Virginia Institute of Marine Science at the College of William & Mary.

Education
Milliman earned Bachelor of Science from the University of Rochester, a Master of Science from the University of Washington, Seattle, and a PhD from the University of Miami.

Research
In 1968, Milliman and K.O. Emery published an article in Science suggesting that the Holocene transgression began 14,000 years ago and was over by 7,000 years ago. In 2003 he and Jonathan A. Warrick found that rivers of Southern California, such as Santa Clara River and Transverse Ranges discharge a huge amount of sediment especially during El Niño–Southern Oscillation. In 2005 Milliman studied seven rivers in Taiwan after typhoon Herb swept through the region. He and his colleagues also studied the following river and shelf systems: Yangtze, Yellow, Fly, etc. 

Milliman was named one of Virginia's "outstanding scientists" by Governor Bob McDonnell in 2012.

Selected publications
 (pbk reprint of 1974 publication)

References

External links

1938 births
Living people
University of Miami alumni
University of Rochester alumni
University of Washington alumni
College of William & Mary faculty
Marine geologists
Place of birth missing (living people)